Van Roxas (born Van Louelle Pojas on November 8, 1989) is a Filipino actor, television personality, and former reality show contestant. He placed as the 5th Star Dreamer of Pinoy Dream Academy Season 2. He did a show with the Drama Princess of ABS-CBN's Kim Chiu entitles Maling Akala.

Personal life 
Van Louelle Pojas better known as Van Roxas is from Talisay, Cebu. He is a Physical Therapy student and band vocalist from Cebu.

His parents have separated, his mother is in the States while his father has his own life away from Van.

He was a support act of the Irish pop band Westlife for their 2011 Gravity Tour.

Television

Information
 Van Roxas and Jay-r Siaboc are from Talisay City, Cebu. Both are band vocalist.
 His first acting role was Karl Alda, Kim Chiu's love interest in Maling Akala.

References
 Wikipedia, Pinoy Dream Academy -Pinoy Dream Academy (season 2)
 ABS-CBN-"Coming from a well-off family, good-looking, and talented, Van is expected to be contended with his life.",
 SunStar, "Serna: Van Roxas: one more crack at show biz", 

Living people
Pinoy Dream Academy participants
Star Magic
People from Talisay, Cebu
Male actors from Cebu
1989 births